The lesser Antillean tanager (Stilpnia cucullata) is a species of bird in the family Thraupidae.
It is found in Grenada and Saint Vincent.
Its natural habitats are subtropical or tropical moist lowland forests and heavily degraded former forest.

References

External links
 Stamps (for Grenada-(2), "Grenada of the Grenadines", Saint Vincent and the Grenadines)

Stilpnia
Birds of the Lesser Antilles
Birds described in 1834
Taxonomy articles created by Polbot
Taxobox binomials not recognized by IUCN